Mehatl Creek Provincial Park is a provincial park in British Columbia, Canada, located in the central Lillooet Ranges to the west of Boston Bar.

References

Lillooet Ranges
Provincial parks of British Columbia
Fraser Canyon
1997 establishments in British Columbia
Protected areas established in 1997